Stonewall Jackson Middle School may refer to:

Virginia 
 Stonewall Jackson Middle School (Hanover County, Virginia), Mechanicsville, Virginia
 Stonewall Middle School, former name of Unity Braxton Middle School, Prince William County, Virginia
 Stonewall Jackson Middle School, former name of John P. Fishwick Middle School, Roanoke, Virginia

Other states 
 Stonewall Jackson Middle School, Orlando, Florida
 Stonewall Jackson Middle School, former name of Yolanda Black Navarro Middle School, a Houston Independent School District school, Texas
 Stonewall Jackson Middle School, former name of Katherine Johnson Middle School in Kanawha County, West Virginia

See also 
 Stonewall Jackson School (disambiguation)